Hotel Brown is a national historic site located at 202 Main St. N., Flasher, North Dakota in Morton County.

It was added to the National Register of Historic Places on June 23, 2014.

The State Historical Society of North Dakota announced its NRHP listing in 2014 with statement:
The Hotel Brown in Flasher has had numerous names since it was built in 1910 but it is remembered as the local gathering place for travelers and locals, especially in the 1930s and 1940s. It is one of the oldest buildings in the community in its original location and it still serves the community by providing lodging.

References

Hotel buildings on the National Register of Historic Places in North Dakota
National Register of Historic Places in Morton County, North Dakota